The Student Health Facility is a building at the University of Kentucky along South Limestone, adjacent to the Charles T. Wethington Jr. Building. The four-story 73,849 sq. ft. structure, designed by Omni Architects of Lexington,  will contain a partial basement and mechanical penthouse

Service

 Preventative care visits can include routine physical exams, and so on.
 Acute care is offered for unexpected illnesses and injuries.
 Flu shots: Offers flu shots each year unless there is a shortage of flu vaccine.Phone Number: 859-323-2778 (To make an appointment)

See also
 Buildings at the University of Kentucky
 Cityscape of Lexington, Kentucky
 University of Kentucky

References

Buildings at the University of Kentucky
Health in Kentucky